The Arboretum de l'Ile de la Ronde (6 hectares) is an arboretum located in Saint-Pourçain-sur-Sioule, Allier, Auvergne, France. It is open daily; admission is free.

The arboretum is set within a park on the Ile de la Rond, bordering the Sioule river, and contains walking paths among a variety of flowers and trees.

See also 
 List of botanical gardens in France

References 
 Jardinez entry (French)
 Allier Tourism entry (French)
 Les Jardins de France entry

Ile de la Ronde, Arboretum de
Ile de la Ronde, Arboretum de